Piccard Cove is a cove bordered by O'Neal Point to the northwest and Sophie Cliff to the northeast, and forming the southernmost part of Wilhelmina Bay, along the west coast of Graham Land. Charted by the Belgian Antarctic Expedition under Gerlache, 1897–99. Named by the United Kingdom Antarctic Place-Names Committee (UK-APC) in 1960 for Auguste Piccard, Swiss physicist, stratosphere pioneer who reached a height of 9.5 nautical miles (18 km) in a hydrogen-filled balloon in 1931.

Coves of Graham Land
Danco Coast